The 24th Legislative Assembly of Saskatchewan was elected in the 1999 Saskatchewan election. It was controlled by the New Democratic Party under Premier Roy Romanow. Romanow resigned as New Democratic Party leader in 2001 and was succeeded by Lorne Calvert for the remainder of the 24th Assembly.

NDP/Liberal coalition

The election resulted in a divided legislature, with the governing NDP and the opposition each winning exactly 29 seats. As a result, Romanow negotiated a coalition agreement with the Liberal Party, which saw that party's three MLAs given cabinet posts in exchange for supporting the government. One of the three Liberal MLAs, Jack Hillson, subsequently resigned from the cabinet and sat as an independent for the duration of the Assembly.

Shortly after being elected leader of the Liberal Party in 2001, David Karwacki ordered an end to the coalition agreement. However, the two Liberal MLAs who remained in cabinet, Jim Melenchuk and Ron Osika, instead quit the Liberal caucus and continued in coalition with the NDP as independent MLAs. Both subsequently ran as NDP candidates in the 2003 election, but were both defeated.

Party standings

Members

References

 

Terms of the Saskatchewan Legislature